A Little Bit TV is an Irish documentary series that is airing on RTÉ. Made as part of the broadcaster's TV50 celebrations, in each episode, a well-known RTÉ presenter is profiled in detail.

History

A Little Bit TV is the fifth incarnation of the A Little Bit... series of television programmes.  In 2005 the first series, A Little Bit Country, profiled a well-known performer in the country and Irish music genre. Three years later in 2008 A Little Bit Showband profiled some of the most popular showbands from the 1960s. The following year A Little Bit Funny profiled some of the most popular comedians from yesteryear. In 2011 A Little Bit Eurovision looked at Ireland's close links with the Eurovision Song Contest. The Following year RTÉ Television celebrated its golden jubilee and the fifth incarnation, A Little Bit TV, began profiling some of the most well-known television presenters from fifty years of television in Ireland.

Transmissions

Series One (2012)

References

2012 Irish television series debuts
Irish documentary television series
RTÉ original programming